Amanece, que no es poco is a 1989 Spanish comedy film written and directed by José Luis Cuerda.

Cast

 José Sazatornil as Cabo Gutiérrez (billed as José Sazatornil 'Saza')
 Carmen de Lirio as Doña Rocío - su señora
 Ovidi Montllor as Pascual
 Carmen Rodríguez as Su mujer
 Rafael Díaz as Fermín
 Amada Tercero as Su mujer
 Cassen as Cura párroco (billed as Casto Sendra 'Cassen')
 Manuel Alexandre as Paquito - su padre
 María Ángeles Ariza as Merceditas - su prima
 Rafael Alonso as El Alcalde
 Fedra Lorente as Susan - su amiga
 Cris Huerta as Tirso - el mesonero (billed as Chris Huertas)
 Elisa Belmonte as Soprano
 María I. González as Pianista
 Paco Hernández as Don Roberto - maestro escuela (billed as Francisco Hernández)
 Jorge V. Ortiz as Rafaelito
 Samuel Claxton as Nge Ndomo
 Chus Lampreave as Álvarez - su madre
 Alberto Bové as Pedro - su tío
 Luis Ciges as Jimmy
 Antonio Resines as Teodoro
 Aurora Bautista as La Padington
 Arturo Bonín as Bruno
 María Isbert as Adelaida - la hija
 María Elena Flores as Aurora - la madre
 Paco Cambres as Don Alonso - el médico
 Queta Claver as Doña Remedios - su mujer
 Miguel Rellán as Carmelo, el borracho
 Rosalía Dans as Gabriela - su mujer
 Pastora Vega as Elena La Labradora
 Tito Valverde as Intellectual (billed as Fernando Valverde)
 Ferran Rañé as Mariano
 Antonio Passy as Garcinuño
 Alberto Delgado as Joven
 Francisco Martínez as Sixto - su hijo

Bibliography 
 José Luis Cuerda, Amanece, que no es poco, Pepitas de calabaza, 2013.

External links
 

Spanish comedy
1989 films
1980s Spanish-language films
Films set in Spain
1989 comedy films
1980s Spanish films
Films directed by José Luis Cuerda